Okan Yilmaz (born 13 October 1997) is an Austrian professional footballer who plays for 2. Liga club SV Horn.

Club career
On 7 February 2022, Yilmaz signed with SV Horn until the end of the season.

Personal life
Born in Austria, Yilmaz is of Turkish descent.

References

External links
Okan Yilmaz at ÖFB

1997 births
Sportspeople from Innsbruck
Footballers from Tyrol (state)
Austrian people of Turkish descent
Living people
Austrian footballers
Association football midfielders
FC Wacker Innsbruck (2002) players
SK Vorwärts Steyr players
SKU Amstetten players
Menemenspor footballers
Karşıyaka S.K. footballers
SV Horn players
Austrian Regionalliga players
2. Liga (Austria) players
TFF First League players
TFF Third League players
Austrian expatriate footballers
Expatriate footballers in Turkey
Austrian expatriate sportspeople in Turkey